Mozambique competed at the 1992 Summer Olympics in Barcelona, Spain.

Competitors
The following is the list of number of competitors in the Games.

Athletics

Men
Track & road events

Women
Track & road events

Swimming

Men

Women

References

Sources
Official Olympic Reports

Nations at the 1992 Summer Olympics
1992
Oly